Thailand competed at the 2000 Summer Paralympics in Sydney, Australia. 41 competitors from Thailand won 11 medals, including 5 gold, 4 silver and 2 bronze to finish 30th in the medal table.

Medal table

See also 
 Thailand at the Paralympics
 Thailand at the 2000 Summer Olympics

References 

Thailand at the Paralympics
2000 in Thai sport
Nations at the 2000 Summer Paralympics